Maltsch may refer to:

 Maltsch, German name for Malše, a river in Austria and in the Czech Republic, and a right tributary of the Vltava
 Maltsch, German name for Malczyce, village in Środa Śląska County, Lower Silesian Voivodeship, in south-western Poland